Alf Ivar Hildrum (born 18 April 1948) is a Norwegian media executive and politician for the Labour Party.

He was born in Overhalla. A siv.øk. by education, he worked as an information secretary in the Norwegian Ministry of Trade and Shipping from 1977 to 1978. He was then promoted to private secretary (today known as political advisor) in the same ministry, succeeding Tove Strand Gerhardsen. He was a journalist in Arbeidernes Pressekontor from 1979 to 1981, editor-in-chief of Bergens Arbeiderblad from 1981 to 1984, subeditor in Arbeidernes Pressekontor from 1984 to 1988, chief executive officer of A-pressen from 1988 to 2007 and then chief executive officer of TV 2.

References

1948 births
Living people
People from Overhalla
Norwegian civil servants
Labour Party (Norway) politicians
Norwegian newspaper editors
Norwegian television executives
TV 2 (Norway) people